Monday Begins on Saturday is a 1965 science fantasy novel by Soviet writers Boris and Arkady Strugatsky, with illustrations by Yevgeniy Migunov. Set in a fictional town in northern Russia, where research in magic occurs, the novel is a satire of Soviet scientific research institutes. It offers an idealistic view of the scientific work ethic, as reflected in the title which suggests that the scientists' weekends are nonexistent. Their idealism is contrasted by an inept administration and a dishonest, show-horse professor. 

The "Scientific Research Institute of Sorcery and Wizardry" (or, in Andrew Bromfield's 2002 translation "the National Institute for the Technology of Witchcraft and Thaumaturgy", abbreviated to "NITWITT"), located in the fictional Northern Russian town of Solovets, is portrayed as a place where everyone either works diligently, or else their loss of honesty is symbolized by their ears becoming more and more hairy.  These hairy-eared people are viewed with disdain by the idealistic scientists. The more morally backward specimens are the most self-aggrandizing and sure of their own significance, while conducting the more ridiculous and nonsensical pseudo-research, to justify their position.

Tale of the Troika, which describes Soviet bureaucracy at its worst, is a sequel, featuring many of the same characters.

Characters and events 
The novel is written from the point of view of Aleksandr Ivanovich Privalov (usually called Sasha), a young programmer from Leningrad, who picks up two hitchhikers during a road trip north through Karelia.  After the two find out that he is a programmer, they convince him to stay in Solovets and work together with them in the Scientific Research Institute of Sorcery and Wizardry (abbreviated NIIChaVo in Russian, which sounds very close to "Ничего", the word for "nothing").

The book contains a large number of references to well-known Russian fairy tales and children's stories: Baba Yaga makes an appearance as does Zmey Gorynych and the Learned Cat from Pushkin's "Ruslan and Lyudmila", who turns out to be a slightly demented bard. Some figures from lore and history also appear, such as genies and Cain. The authors portray these persons and concepts (such as magic) either as objects of scientific inquiry or members of the Institute. Merlin, for example, is described as an incompetent boaster and is in charge of the Institute's Department of Predictions. The Technical Helpdesk is headed by one Sabaoth Baalovich Odin, also described as the most powerful wizard in the universe, while the vivarium is staffed by Alfred, a vampire.

The novel is remarkable for its colorful characters. For example, Cristóbal Josevich Junta was formerly a Grand Inquisitor, and is now the head of the Department of the Meaning of Life. He is also a talented taxidermist. It is rumored that his collection includes a Standartenführer of the SS, an erstwhile friend of Junta's and also a taxidermist. Cristóbal Josevich, so goes the rumor, was equally skilled, only faster. Fyodor Simeonovich Kivrin, the head of the Department of Linear Happiness, is a stuttering big guy, an eternal optimist, an apprentice programmer, a fan of Erle Stanley Gardner, and a mentor of sorts to Privalov. Modest Matveevich Kamnoedov (whose surname translates to "stone-eater") is an archetypal administrator and bureaucrat who does not understand the "Monday begins on Saturday" work ethic.  On New Year's Eve, he directs Privalov to turn off the lights and lock all doors, but Privalov soon finds out that everyone is still at the Institute and research continues.  For example, the archetypically rude Viktor Korneev (usually called Vitka) claims to have left his clone to work in his lab, which Privalov recognizes to be Korneev himself, because clones never sing or show any emotion. 

Much of the action centers on the laboratory of Amvrosiy Ambroisovich Vybegallo (roughly "one who runs out", a fictional surname based on ancient Polish-Lithuanian names like Jagiello), a professor whose gargantuan experiments are spectacularly wasteful and crowd-pleasing but utterly unscientific. In his quest for an "ideal man" he creates a model of "partially satisfied man" (allusion to Soviet dogma that under Communism all people will be perfect and will have all their needs satisfied, and that Soviet socialism is an intermediate state on the path to full Communism) which eats inordinate amounts of raw offal achieving ever shortening periods of lethargic "full satisfaction", until it begins eating without ever stopping and eventually bursts, literally. On a New Year's Day Vybegallo hatches up his ultimate creation, a "model of a completely satisfied man" who can instantly satisfy all of his wants. Immediately upon hatching the model attempts to consume the whole universe, but Roman Oyra-Oyra manages to stop him by throwing at him a genie in a bottle, clear allusion to a Molotov cocktail. Vybegallo is modeled in large part on Trofim Lysenko, the charlatan and politico responsible for many setbacks in the science of genetics in USSR.

The final part of the book concerns the mystery of Janus Poluektovich Nevstruev, the director of the institute, who is known to be one man in two personas, called A-Janus and U-Janus.

Translations 
The first English translation was published by  DAW Books in 1977.
In August 2005, Seagull Publishing, London, published a translation by Andrew Bromfield titled Monday Starts on Saturday. The publisher described it as "the Russian equivalent of Harry Potter, written 40 years earlier". The book features illustrations by Evgeny Migunov, one of the best illustrators of the works of the Strugatsky brothers.

Puns and hints
 The Russian language abbreviation for the institute, NIICHAVO, sounds like a colloquial pronunciation for the word "nichevo" ("it doesn't matter" or "nothing"). In the English translation by Andrew Bromfield, the name of the Institute has been translated as NITWITT (National Institute for the Technology of Witchcraft and Thaumaturgy).
 The place of "Solovets" hints at Solovetsky Islands, with their historical and mythological associations.
 "A-Janus and U-Janus" is a hint to Janus Bifrons. In Russian, the word "litso" means both "person" and "face" (hint to Janus).
 Vybegallo with his pseudo-commoner appearance and radical pseudoscientific ideas is a hint to Trofim Lysenko.

Plans for adaptation
 In 1965, a TV play was staged, based on the book.
 Charodei (Sorcerers) TV film  (1982) was initially written by Strugatskys as adaptation of the second part of the novel. But director Konstantin Bromberg turned down the script due to its serious tone and social commentary, and the Strugatskys had to rewrite their script as a light-hearted romantic comedy. As a result, the movie bore almost no resemblance to the book besides the similar setting and several characters' names. 
 In 2015, Teterin Films studio has obtained the rights to adaptation, with plans to release a feature film based on the book. As of 2018, the project was still in development hell.

References

Sources
Byron Lindsey, "On the Strugackij Brothers’ Contemporary Fairytale Monday Begins of Saturday". Book chapter. "The Supernatural in Russian Literature". Editor: Amy Mandelker. Columbus: Slavica, 1988: 290-302.

External links
Online text at Lib.ru 

1964 fantasy novels
1964 science fiction novels
1964 in the Soviet Union
Novels by Arkady and Boris Strugatsky
Novels about time travel
Novels set in Russia
DAW Books books
Russian novels adapted into films
Russian novels adapted into television shows
Science fiction novels adapted into films